William Sterrett Ramsey (June 12, 1810 – October 17, 1840) was a Democratic member of the U.S. House of Representatives from Pennsylvania.

William S. Ramsey was born in Carlisle, Pennsylvania.  He pursued classical studies in the United States and Europe, and served as attaché of the American Legation in London.

Ramsey was elected as a Democrat to the Twenty-sixth Congress and served until his death before the commencement of the Twenty-seventh Congress, to which he had been reelected. He died by suicide in Baltimore, Maryland, in 1840 and was interred in Ashland Cemetery in Carlisle, Pennsylvania.

See also
List of United States Congress members who died in office (1790–1899)

Sources

The Political Graveyard

1810 births
1840 deaths
People from Carlisle, Pennsylvania
Democratic Party members of the United States House of Representatives from Pennsylvania
American expatriates in the United Kingdom
19th-century American politicians